The 1983 Geneva Open was a men's tennis tournament played on clay courts that was part of the 1983 Volvo Grand Prix. It was played at Geneva in Switzerland and took place from 19 September until 25 September 1983. First-seeded Mats Wilander won the singles title.

Finals

Singles

 Mats Wilander defeated  Henrik Sundström 3–6, 6–1, 6–3
 It was Wilander's 6th singles title of the year and the 10th of his career.

Doubles

 Stanislav Birner /  Blaine Willenborg defeated  Joakim Nyström /  Mats Wilander 6–1, 2–6, 6–3
 It was Birner's only title of the year and the 1st of his career. It was Willenborg's only title of the year and the 1st of his career.

References

External links
 ITF tournament edition details

 
20th century in Geneva